PHD finger protein 10 is a protein that in humans is encoded by the PHF10 gene.

Function 

This gene contains a predicted ORF that encodes a protein with two zinc finger domains. The function of the encoded protein is not known. Sequence analysis suggests that multiple alternatively spliced transcript variants are derived from this gene but the full-length nature of only two of them is known. These two splice variants encode different isoforms. A pseudogene for this gene is located on Xq28.

References

Further reading

External links 
 

Transcription factors